Girlfriend a 2019 Marathi language film is directorial debut of Upendra Sidhaye. Starting Amey Wagh and Sai Tamhankar and has Isha Keskar, Uday Nene, Yatin Karyekar and Kavita Lad in supporting roles. It is  produced by Anish Joag, Ranjit Gugle, Kaustubh Dhamane, Ameya Patil, Salil Milind Datar and Afeefa Nadiadwala, under the banner of Huge Production, Pratishad Production and Triple Ace Production. The film was released on 26 July 2019.

Plot Summary
The story revolves around Nachiket (Amey Wagh), a nerdy youngster who wants to get a girlfriend. He finds one in Alisha (Sai Tamhankar).

Cast 
 Amey Wagh as Nachiket Pradhan
 Sai Tamhankar as Alisha Nerurkar/Payal Mehta
 Kavita Lad as Nachiket's mother
 Yatin Karyekar as Nachiket's father
 Isha Keskar as Nachiket's friend's wife
 Uday Nene as Nachiket's friend (Aditya)
 Rasika Sunil as Nachiket's colleague
 Suyog Gorhe as Sandy (Nachiket's one of friend)
 Sagar Deshmukh as Nachiket's Boss
 Pratyancha Narale as Baby

Marketing and release
The film was released on 26 July 2019. For promotion of the film, Amey Wagh made a facebook post asking for name for a girl. He later revealed a poster of the film and stated that the name was for the girlfriend in the movie. The title track for the film, "Nachya Got a Girlfriend" was released on 18 June 2018.

Soundtrack

The soundtrack of the film is composed by 
Hrishikesh, Saurabh and Jasraj while lyrics are written by Kshitij Patwardhan.
The chorus are by Darshana Jog, Amita Ghugari, Pranjali Barve, Bhagyashree Abhyankar, Poonam Godbole, Yash Gokhale, 
Hrishikesh Kelkar, Ajit Vispute, Saurabh Daftardar and Sandeep Ubale.

References

External links
 

2010s Marathi-language films
2019 films